Colin Bucksey is a British-born American film and television director.

Career
Since the 1970s, Bucksey has accumulated a number of credits in British TV, directing episodes of Crown Court, Armchair Thriller, Educating Marmalade and Bergerac.

He eventually moved into American TV, directing episodes of Miami Vice, Crime Story, Midnight Caller, Wiseguy, Sliders, Nash Bridges, Lexx, NCIS: Naval Criminal Investigative Service, Numb3rs, Breaking Bad, The 4400, Burn Notice, Better Call Saul, Briarpatch and others. More recently, he directed Fargo episodes "The Six Ungraspables" and "Buridan's Ass," the latter episode which earned him a Primetime Emmy Award for Outstanding Directing for a Miniseries, Movie, or a Dramatic Special.

Bucksey also directed the film TV film Blue Money (1985) starring, Tim Curry and Dealers (1989), starring Paul McGann and Rebecca De Mornay.

Personal life
Bucksey married Verity Lambert (the first producer of Doctor Who) in 1973. They divorced in 1987. He is now married to Sally Bucksey, with whom he has two sons: Alfred and Theodore.

Filmography

As director

As producer

References

External links

1946 births
American film directors
American television directors
British expatriates in the United States
British television directors
English-language film directors
Film directors from London
Living people
People from Camberwell
Date of birth missing (living people)
Primetime Emmy Award winners